In finite group theory, Jordan's theorem states that if a primitive permutation group G is a subgroup of the symmetric group Sn and contains a p-cycle for some prime number p < n − 2, then G is either the whole symmetric group Sn or the alternating group An.  It was first proved by Camille Jordan.

The statement can be generalized to the case that p is a prime power.

References

External links
Jordan's Symmetric Group Theorem on Mathworld

Permutation groups
Theorems about finite groups